Sylvester Massele Mabumba (born 10 May 1965) is a Tanzanian CCM politician and Member of Parliament for Dole constituency since 2010.

References

1965 births
Living people
Chama Cha Mapinduzi MPs
Tanzanian MPs 2010–2015
Mzumbe University alumni
Southern New Hampshire University alumni